Alana Pedrozo (born 7 August 1992) is a Paraguayan team handball player for San Jose and the Paraguay national team.

She represented Paraguay at the 2013 World Women's Handball Championship in Serbia, where the Paraguayan team placed 21st.

References

Paraguayan female handball players
1992 births
Living people
20th-century Paraguayan women
21st-century Paraguayan women